Deborah F. Kelly is an American biomedical engineer who is a professor at Pennsylvania State University. Her research makes use of cryogenic electron microscopy to better understand human development and disease. She serves as President of the Microscopy Society of America.

Early life and education 
Kelly attended Florida State University for graduate research. She moved to the Harvard Medical School for her postdoctoral research. After seven years as a research fellow at Harvard, Kelly joined the Virginia Tech School of Medicine as an assistant professor.

Research and career 
In 2017, Kelly was promoted to associate professor at Virginia Tech. She moved to Pennsylvania State University as Director of the Center for Structural Oncology in 2019.

Kelly combines structural and functional characterization tools to understand cellular communication. Amongst these, she has considered protein receptors. On the surfaces of cells, these receptors transmit information about cellular microenvironment to cellular nuclei. These signals can cause genes to turn off and on. Cancer cells can thrive when genes are activated inappropriately during cell division. These cancerous cells can evade conventional forms of treatment and are understood to result in the formation of malignant tumors. By determining the three-dimensional structure of these protein complexes Kelly hopes to design new therapeutic interventions.

Kelly makes use of cryogenic electron microscopy to visualize these cellular interactions. Specifically, she has developed a platform ('affinity capture') that can isolate the cells which cause metastasis. Kelly developed a microchip toolkit to identify mutations in BRCA1. These microchips, which she called cryo-chips, use silicon nitride to quickly identify, isolate and tether protein assemblies.

When the COVID-19 pandemic started, Kelly shifted her focus to the SARS-CoV-2 virus. Her studies demonstrated the airborne transmission of COVID-19. Kelly was elected President of the Microscopy Society of America in 2022.

Selected publications

References 

Florida State University alumni
Living people
Pennsylvania State University faculty
Virginia Tech faculty
American biomedical engineers
21st-century American educators
American women educators
Year of birth missing (living people)
21st-century American scientists